Kouka may refer to:

Kouka, Bam, Burkina Faso
Kouka, Banwa, Burkina Faso
Kouka, Cyprus
Kouka, Togo
The common name of Ahmed Hassan (footballer, born 1993)